Crestline is a village in Crawford and Richland Counties in the U.S. state of Ohio. Crestline's population was 4,630 at the 2010 census. It is the third largest municipality in Crawford County. The Crawford County portion of Crestline is part of the Bucyrus Micropolitan Statistical Area, while the small portion of the village that extends into Richland County is considered part of the Mansfield Metropolitan Statistical Area.

History
First came the railroad, and then came the town. It all started in 1850 when a route was needed between Shelby and Galion, a distance of 13 miles, by the Cleveland, Columbus and Cincinnati Railroad, or the "Bee Line" as it was known then. Since there was no town between Shelby and Galion, it was decided that a station should be placed halfway for passenger convenience. The station was constructed where the line crossed the Leesville road.

Crestline was platted in 1852.  It was once thought to be the highest point in Ohio and was named from its high elevation.

This station soon developed into a town, with a general store, post office, and a few homes. Early settlers in the village believed that the town was the watershed of the state, where streams to the north emptied into Lake Erie and those to the south emptied into the Ohio River, thus the name Crest Line. The town was not on the watershed line, but the name stuck and eventually became one word.

During its heyday, Crestline was a division point for the Pennsylvania Railroad's Pittsburgh, Fort Wayne and Chicago Railway. The city housed major engine facilities and would often be the point where motive power was changed for the relatively flat runs to and from Chicago, Illinois.  In addition to the town's station being a stop on the Pennsylvania Railroad's east–west trains, the station served as a transfer point to the New York Central Railroad's northeast–southwest trains.

On November 1, 1903 two Pennsylvania line train cars carrying dynamite exploded, causing damage to the rail lines and several train cars. This disaster is noted as one of the catalysts which began the regulation of the shipping of hazardous substances.  

The Pennsylvania Railroad's engine facilities included a roundhouse on Crestline Road, decommissioned in 1968 in the aftermath of the merger between the Pennsylvania Railroad and the New York Central Railroad to form Penn Central. Demolition of the historic roundhouse commenced in 2007 after years of neglect. But, some buildings still stand. Today, Chicago, Fort Wayne and Eastern Railroad, CSX and Norfolk Southern trains operate in and around Crestline.

Major trains making stops in Crestline
New York Central:
Ohio State Limited (Cincinnati - Columbus - Cleveland - Buffalo - New York)
Southwestern (St. Louis - Indianapolis - Cleveland - Buffalo - New York)
Pennsylvania:
Admiral, (Chicago- New York)
General, (Chicago - New York)
Manhattan Limited, (Chicago - New York)  
Pennsylvania Limited, (Chicago - New York) 
Broadway Limited, (Chicago - New York)

The town today
Crestline, originally a railroad community, now thrives from the various businesses and industries located there. Crestline, however, is still considered a railroad community. The two crossing railroads that caused the beginning of the village still remain active.

On September 4, 2017 at approximately 10:45 p.m. a tornado passed from the west to just north of the village causing extensive damage to rural properties near the village. The National Weather Service classified the twister as an EF-2 with winds above 115 miles per hour. This incident was a rare event.

Geography
Crestline is located at  (40.784657, -82.740192), along the Sandusky River near its headwaters.

Demographics

2010 census
As of the census of 2010, there were 4,630 people, 1,914 households, and 1,256 families residing in the city. The racial makeup of the city was 94.1% White, 2.7% African American, 0.2% Native American, 0.5% Asian, 0.2% from other races, and 2.3% from two or more races. Hispanic or Latino of any race were 1.1% of the population.

There were 1,914 households, of which 33.6% had children under the age of 18 living with them, 44.0% were married couples living together, 15.1% had a female householder with no husband present, 6.5% had a male householder with no wife present, and 34.4% were non-families. 30.0% of all households were made up of individuals, and 13.6% had someone living alone who was 65 years of age or older. The average household size was 2.41 and the average family size was 2.94.

The median age in the city was 37.8 years. 26.6% of residents were under the age of 18; 9.3% were between the ages of 18 and 24; 22.8% were from 25 to 44; 24.8% were from 45 to 64; and 16.5% were 65 years of age or older. The gender makeup of the city was 47.6% male and 52.4% female.

2000 census
As of the census of 2000, there were 5,088 people, 2,070 households, and 1,370 families residing in the city. The population density was 1,761.8 people per square mile (679.8/km2). There were 2,251 housing units at an average density of 779.5 per square mile (300.7/km2). The racial makeup of the city was 96.58% White, 1.81% African American, 0.18% Native American, 0.26% Asian, 0.06% Pacific Islander, 0.22% from other races, and 0.90% from two or more races. Hispanic or Latino of any race were 0.67% of the population.

There were 2,070 households, out of which 33.3% had children under the age of 18 living with them, 48.9% were married couples living together, 12.6% had a female householder with no husband present, and 33.8% were non-families. 29.2% of all households were made up of individuals, and 13.1% had someone living alone who was 65 years of age or older. The average household size was 2.44 and the average family size was 3.01.

In the city the population was spread out, with 26.7% under the age of 18, 8.6% from 18 to 24, 29.1% from 25 to 44, 21.0% from 45 to 64, and 14.5% who were 65 years of age or older. The median age was 36 years. For every 100 females there were 92.1 males. For every 100 females age 18 and over, there were 87.9 males.

The median income for a household in the city was $31,392, and the median income for a family was $37,275. Males had a median income of $33,520 versus $22,455 for females. The per capita income for the city was $16,522. About 9.8% of families and 12.4% of the population were below the poverty line, including 16.5% of those under age 18 and 5.2% of those age 65 or over.

Government
The Census Bureau recognizes Crestline as a village, its 2010 population of 4,630 makes it a village under Ohio law.

Crestline operates under a mayor-council system, with a council of six members.  In 2019, the mayor is Joy Miley, administrator is John Rostash, fire department is led by Steve Krock, and police department is led by Jeff Shook.

Abraham Lincoln's Funeral Train
Following his death by assassination, the body of Abraham Lincoln was brought from Washington, D.C. to its final resting place in Lincoln's hometown of Springfield, Illinois, by funeral train.  The train left Washington, D.C., on April 21, 1865 at 12:30 pm and traveled  to Springfield, arriving on May 3, 1865. Several stops were made along the way, including Crestline on April 29, 1865 at 4:07 am.

Notable people
 Gates Brown, baseball player
 Les Channell, baseball player
 Frank Emmer, baseball player
 Mark Fenton, actor
 Mike Gottfried, football coach, commentator
 Jack Harbaugh, football player, coach, and father of NFL coaches John and Jim Harbaugh
 Kevin Keith, American prisoner
 Robert Kurtzman, film director, producer, screenwriter, special effects artist
 Marabel Morgan, author, anti-feminist

See also
 Crestline Exempted Village School District

References

http://www.weather.gov/cle/event_20170904_tornado

External links
 Village website
 Crestline Community Development Team
 Crestline Chamber of Commerce
 Village of Crestline Zoning Map

Villages in Crawford County, Ohio
Villages in Richland County, Ohio
Villages in Ohio